The 2015 Fergana Challenger was a professional tennis tournament played on hard courts. It was the 16th edition of the tournament for men which was part of the 2015 ATP Challenger Tour, offering a total of $50,000 in prize money, and the fifth edition of the event for women on the 2015 ITF Women's Circuit, offering a total of $25,000 in prize money. It took place in Fergana, Uzbekistan, on 15–22 June 2015.

Men's singles main draw entrants

Seeds 

 1 Rankings as of 8 June 2015

Other entrants 
The following players received wildcards into the singles main draw:
  Jurabek Karimov
  Saida'lo Saidkarimov
  Khumoun Sultanov
  Shonigmatjon Shofayziyev

The following players received entry from the qualifying draw:
  Daniiar Duldaev
  Markos Kalovelonis
  Mikhail Ledovskikh
  Lukas Mugevičius

Men's doubles main draw entrants

Seeds 

 1 Rankings as of 26 May 2015

Other entrants 
The following pairs received wildcards into the doubles main draw:
  Rizo Saidkhodjaev /  Diyor Yuldashev
  Ahad Ermatov /  Azizbek Lukmanov
  Rasul Akhmadaliev /  Khumoun Sultanov

Women's singles main draw entrants

Seeds 

 1 Rankings as of 26 May 2015

Other entrants 
The following players received wildcards into the singles main draw:
  Akgul Amanmuradova (withdrew)
  Shakhnoza Khatamova
  Polina Merenkova
  Sarvinoz Saidhujaeva

The following players received entry from the qualifying draw:
  Kamila Kerimbayeva
  Varvara Kuznetsova
  Katya Malikova
  Amina Mukhametshina
  Gulchekhra Mukhammadsidikova
  Alisa Tymofeyeva
  Komola Umarova
  Guzal Yusupova

The following player received entry by a lucky loser spot:
  Alina Abdurakhimova

Women's doubles main draw entrants

Seeds 

 1 Rankings as of 26 May 2015

Other entrants 
The following pairs received wildcards into the doubles main draw:
  Shakhnoza Khatamova /  Sarvinoz Saidhujaeva
  Polina Merenkova /  Komola Umarova
  Amina Mukhametshina /  Jamilya Sadykzhanova

Champions

Men's singles 

  Teymuraz Gabashvili def.  Alexander Kudryavtsev 6–2, 1–0 retired

Women's singles 

  Anastasiya Komardina def.  Sabina Sharipova, 6–2, 1–6, 6–4

Men's doubles 

  Sergey Betov /  Michail Elgin def.  Denys Molchanov /  Franko Škugor 6–3, 7–5

Women's doubles 

  Sharmada Balu /  Tadeja Majerič def.  Vlada Ekshibarova /  Natasha Palha, 7–5, 6–3

References

External links 
 Official website

2015 ATP Challenger Tour
2015